Territory located in present-day Ethiopia

Moti = King

See also
Monarchies of Ethiopia
Rulers and heads of state of Ethiopia

Leqa Qellam
Leqa Qellam